Wellness Corporate Solutions is a company that claims to promote healthy workplace cultures through biometric screenings, health coaching, and comprehensive wellness programming. Founded in 2004 by Fiona Gathright and Juliet Rodman, Wellness Corporate Solutions recorded 644% revenue growth between 2010 and 2013. WCS clients include a variety of large public- and private-sector organizations, including Fortune 100 corporations.

WCS gives all employees standing desks, mid-day fitness breaks, and workout groups.

References

Companies based in Bethesda, Maryland
Occupational safety and health organizations